Arthur George Harvey (28 December 1866 – 24 July 1927) was a New Zealand doctor.

Background
Harvey was born in Steyning, Sussex, England, on 28 December 1866. He and his mother, Annie Harvey and his father was Bache Harvey came to New Zealand when he was a baby in 1867. He had two older siblings, May and Harry. They travelled on a Cissy and stopped in multiple tropical islands. The boat trip took three months and the whole family lived in New Zealand until his father died twenty years later. His mother went back to England but Arthur, May and Harry stayed. Arthur studied to be a doctor and become notaries between both Maori and Pakeha. A book was written call "Harvey Come Quick", This book recalls the life of Arthur and his career as the famous doctor in New Zealand.

References

1866 births
1927 deaths
English emigrants to New Zealand
New Zealand general practitioners
People from Steyning

External links
aucklandmuseum